Villari is a surname. It may refer to:

Emilio Villari (1836–1904), Italian physicist
Libby Villari (born 1951), American actor
Linda White Mazini Villari (1836–1915), British author and translator
Luigi Villari (1876–1959), Italian historian, diplomat, journalist, and traveloguer
Pasquale Villari (1827–1917), Italian historian and politician

See also
Vilard (disambiguation)
Vilardi (surname), a similarly spelled surname
Villar (surname), a similarly spelled surname
Villard (surname), a similarly spelled surname

Italian-language surnames